The Voice from the Sky is a 1930 American science fiction film serial directed by Ben F. Wilson and starring Wally Wales and Neva Gerber. The film was considered to be a lost film, but was recently rediscovered. It is the first serial film to have full sound.

Cast
 Wally Wales as Jack Deering, U. S. Secret Service
 Neva Gerber (as Jean Dolores) as Jean Lovell
 Robert Walker as Edgar Ballin
 J. P. Lockney as Geoffrey Mentor
 Al Haskell as Henchman 'Patch-Eye'
 Cliff Lyons as Henchman 'Humpy'
 John C. McCallum as J. C. Gates
 Merle Farris as Mrs. Deering (Jack's mother)
 The Man from Nowhere (a mysterious black-cloaked figure)

List of episodes
 Doomed
 The Cave of Horrors
 The Man from Nowhere
 Danger Ahead
 Desperate Deeds
 Trail of Vengeance
 The Scarlet Scourge
 Trapped by Fate
 The Pit of Peril
 Hearts of Steel

See also
 List of film serials
 List of film serials by studio

References

External links

1930 films
1930s English-language films
Film serials
1930s science fiction films
American black-and-white films
Films directed by Ben F. Wilson
American science fiction films
1930s American films